The International Challenger Zhangjiagang is a professional tennis tournament played on hard courts. It is currently part of the ATP Challenger Tour. It is held annually in Zhangjiagang, China since 2017.

Past finals

Singles

Doubles

 
ATP Challenger Tour
Hard court tennis tournaments
Tennis tournaments in China